The Wet Sleddale Horseshoe is an upland area in the English Lake District, around the Wet Sleddale Reservoir, Cumbria. It is the subject of a chapter of Wainwright's book The Outlying Fells of Lakeland.

Ulthwaite Rigg and Sleddale Pike are within the Shap Fells Site of Special Scientific Interest.

References

Fells of the Lake District